Herbert Robin Cayzer, 1st Baron Rotherwick DL (23 July 1881 – 16 March 1958), known as Sir Herbert Cayzer, 1st Baronet, from 1924 to 1939, was a British shipping magnate and Conservative Party politician.

Cayzer was the fifth son of Sir Charles Cayzer, 1st Baronet, and his wife Agnes Elisabeth (née Trickey). Sir August Bernard Tellefsen Cayzer, 1st Baronet, was his elder brother. Cayzer was Chairman of the British & Commonwealth Steamship Company Ltd, of Clan Line Steamers Ltd and of the Union Castle Mail Steamship Company Ltd and also sat as Member of Parliament (MP) for Portsmouth South from 1918 to 1922. Shortly after the 1922 general election, he stood down in order that Leslie Wilson, the Chief Whip, could take the seat – Wilson had been defeated in his own constituency. Cayzer stood for Portsmouth South again at the 1923 general election and was returned to Parliament, holding the seat until 1939. He was created a Baronet, of Tylney in the County of Southampton, in 1924 and in 1939 he was raised to the peerage as Baron Rotherwick, of Tylney in the County of Southampton.

Lord Rotherwick married Freda Penelope, daughter of William Hans Rathbourne, in 1911. He died in March 1958, aged 76, and was succeeded in his titles by his eldest son Herbert. Lady Rotherwick died in 1961.

Notes

References 
 Kidd, Charles, Williamson, David (editors). Debrett's Peerage and Baronetage (1990 edition). New York: St Martin's Press, 1990,

External links 

1881 births
1958 deaths
Herbert
Cayzer, Herbert
Deputy Lieutenants of Hampshire
Cayzer, Herbert
Cayzer, Herbert
Cayzer, Herbert
Cayzer, Herbert
Cayzer, Herbert
Cayzer, Herbert
Cayzer, Herbert
UK MPs who were granted peerages
Barons created by George VI